Nanayam (or Naanayam) is a 1983 Indian Malayalam-language drama film directed by I. V. Sasi and written by T. Damodaran. The film stars Madhu, Mammootty, Mohanlal, Seema, Poornima Jayaram, and Srividya. It is the story of two step brothers, Babu and Raju, who takes over the business of their parents, and the problems they encounter while running it. The music was composed by Shyam.

Cast
 Madhu as Vishwanathan
 Mammootty as Raju
 Mohanlal as Babu
 Seema as Sindhu
 Poornima Bhagyaraj as Maya
 Srividya as Sumathi
 V D Rajappan 
 Sukumari
Poornima Jayaram as Maya
Adoor Bhasi
Janardanan
K. P. Ummer as Krishnapuram Thamby
Paravoor Bharathan as Bharagavan

Soundtrack
The music was composed by Shyam and the lyrics were written by Yusufali Kechery and Poovachal Khader.

References

External links 
 
 http://www.insomniacmania.com/index_default.php?id=212179
 http://www.spicebrisbane.org/showMovie.php?m=22727

1983 films
1980s Malayalam-language films
Films with screenplays by T. Damodaran
Films directed by I. V. Sasi